Elachista heringi is a moth of the family Elachistidae. It is found from the Czech Republic to Spain and Italy and from France to Romania. It is also found in Russia.

The larvae feed on Stipa pennata and Stipa pulcherrima. They mine the leaves of their host plant. The mine has the form of a narrow, usually upper-surface, descending corridor that generally starts just below the leaf tip. The direction of the corridor reverses after some time and it then widens to over half the width of the leaf. Pupation takes place outside of the mine. They are olive green (turning greyish white shortly before pupation) with a dark brown head.

References

heringi
Moths described in 1899
Moths of Europe